The National Football League 1970s All-Decade Team is a list of National Football League (NFL) players selected by voters of the Pro Football Hall of Fame. The squad consists of first- and second-team offensive, defensive, and special teams units, as well as a first- and second-team head coaches.

Punter Ray Guy was the leading vote-getter for the 1970s All-Decade Team, receiving 24 of a possible 25 votes. O. J. Simpson and Lynn Swann were next with 22 and 21 votes, respectively. Linebacker Jack Ham and Tight end Dave Casper each received 20 votes. Next were Defensive end Jack Youngblood and Joe Greene who each had 18 votes.
Holdovers from the National Football League 1960s All-Decade Team were Bob Lilly, Dick Butkus, Merlin Olsen, Larry Wilson, and Jim Bakken, which made them the first players to make multiple All-Decade teams in NFL history.

Offense

Defense

Special teams

Coach

Notes

References

National Football League All-Decade Teams
National Football League records and achievements
Football League 1970s All-Decade Team 
Foot
Foot
National Football League lists